Charlottetown is the capital city of Prince Edward Island in Canada.

Charlottetown may also refer to:

Communities 
In Canada
 Charlottetown, Labrador, Newfoundland and Labrador, a town in Labrador
 Charlottetown, Newfoundland, Newfoundland and Labrador, an unincorporated community in Newfoundland

Electoral districts 
In Canada
 Charlottetown (electoral district), a federal electoral district in Prince Edward Island
 Charlottetown-Brighton, a provincial electoral district in Prince Edward Island
 Charlottetown-Victoria Park, a provincial electoral district in Prince Edward Island

Other uses
Hotel Charlottetown, one of Canada's railway hotels
Charlottetown Mall in Charlotte, North Carolina, the first enclosed mall in the southern United States
 , the name used for three different Canadian warships
 Charlottetown Accord, a package of constitutional amendments, proposed by the Canadian federal and provincial governments in 1992
Charlottetown (soil series), a deep fine sandy loam soil

See also
 Charlotte (disambiguation)